may refer to:
 Sky (Malaysian TV series), a Malaysian Mandarin drama series
 Starry Starry Night (film), a 2011 Taiwanese-Chinese fantasy drama film
 Xing Kong, a Mandarin language television channel targeting Mainland China
 The Starry Night, a painting by the Dutch post-impressionist artist Vincent van Gogh
 Tartaros Online, a South Korean online game